Burren GAA, also known as St Mary's Burren GAA, is a Gaelic Athletic Association club in Burren, County Down, Northern Ireland.

Football titles
All-Ireland Senior Club Football Championship: 2
1985–86, 1988–89
Ulster Senior Club Football Championship: 5
1983, 1984, 1985, 1987, 1988
Down Senior Club Football Championship : 14
1966, 1981, 1983, 1984, 1985, 1986, 1987, 1988, 1992, 1996, 1997, 2010, 2011, 2018
Down Junior Football Championship
1930, 1952
U21 Ulster Club Football Champions Tournament
2009, 2010
Down All County Minor Championship : 6
 1958, 1959, 1960 , 1974, 1979, 1997, 2014, 2016, 2017
Ulster Club Minor Championship

2016 

Ulster Under-16 Championship
2014, 2018

All Ireland Elite Feile

2017

Notable footballers

Kevin McKernan
Donal O'Hare
Daniel McCartan
Thomas McGovern
Paddy O'Rourke - Down All Ireland Winning Captain 1991
Brendan McKernan - Down All Ireland winner 1991 and 1994
James McCartan Jnr - Won 2 All - Ireland senior medals with Down in 1991 and 1994, as well as 2 All star awards
Declan Rooney, played in the 2010 All-Ireland SFC Final
John 'Shorty' Treanor

References

External links
Facebook page

 

1924 establishments in Northern Ireland
Gaelic games clubs in County Down
Gaelic football clubs in County Down